Mount Aldaz is a projecting-type mountain, rising to about  high, that barely protrudes from the ice-covered Usas Escarpment,  east-southeast of Mount Galla, in Marie Byrd Land, Antarctica. The mountain is mostly ice-covered, but has notable rock outcropping along its northern spur. Surveyed by United States Geological Survey on the Executive Committee Range traverse of 1959. Named by Advisory Committee on Antarctic Names for Luis Aldaz, Meteorologist and Scientific Leader at Byrd Station, 1960. Not only does Aldaz have a mountain named in association with him, but he also has a main-belt minor planet named in his honor, 13004 Aldaz (provisional designation: 1982 RR), discovered by Edward L. G. Bowell at the Anderson Mesa Station in Coconino County, Arizona, on September 15, 1982.

References
 

Mountains of Marie Byrd Land